Webb's City was a one-stop department store of sorts that was located in St. Petersburg, Florida and was touted as "the World's Most Unusual Drug Store". It was founded in 1926 by James Earl "Doc" Webb. At its peak Webb's City had 77 departments and measured about ten city blocks. The lyrics to its radio ad were "There'll be no more hoppin' around the town a-shoppin', Webb's City is your one-stop shopping store". It was considered a forerunner to the shopping center. As shopping centers became popular, business dwindled at Webb's City. It was eventually closed in 1979.

Doc Webb's philosophy regarding to Webb City was "stack it high and sell it cheap." This similar philosophy years later led to the success of Sam Walton and his Walmart empire. Webb’s City peaked at over 1,700 employees and because of its location, sales, and low prices was able to have a shopping base primarily consisting of senior citizens and African Americans. The store also hired from the African American community. The store was the focus of controversy in the 1960s over hiring practices.

Store features 
Webb's had a gift shop, hardware store, meat market, beauty salon, travel agency, clothing departments, cafeteria, multiple coffee shops and soda fountains and of course, a drugstore. Webb's City is credited as having implemented a new idea in the checkout aisle, the express lane, 10 items or less. Webb's Outpost was a much smaller store located near the end of the Gandy Bridge to Tampa. A short-lived branch was also opened in the nearby city of Pinellas Park, Florida, which could be considered a forerunner of big-box discount stores such as Wal-Mart and Target.

Webb's City and Civil Rights 
Before the civil rights movement eras of the 1960s and 1970s, Doc Webb’s business was unusual in that Doc would hire African Americans during the time when other businesses in St Petersburg would not. However, African Americans were only hired for positions that were less visible and considered suitable for persons of color, such as a barber or butcher. African Americans were never employed at Webb’s city in any positions of supervision, power, or decision making.  African Americans also made up the bulk of the shoppers at Webb’s City, but were not permitted to eat at the lunch counter, or shop in the “ready to wear” or “men’s suits” departments.

Webb's City and the NAACP 
By June 1960 the NAACP and members of the Black community began actively and publicly picketing and staging “sit-ins” at Webb’s City. The chief complaints of the leadership of the St. Petersburg NAACP were that Doc Webb did not hire African Americans proportionate to the number of African Americans that spent money shopping at Webb’s City and lived in the neighboring community. Out of 1,700 employees, only 150 were African American and none of those employees were allowed positions for advancement within the business. Doc disagreed with the NAACP and began legal proceedings to halt the actions of the St. Petersburg NAACP. On December 7, 1960, Doc successfully stopped NAACP protest actions at Webb’s City through a court-ordered temporary restraining order. However, the restraining order was not the end of the NAACP’s efforts in regards to Webb’s City.

The NAACP filed a motion to dismiss the order and Doc Webb continued his legal efforts ensure picketers stayed away from Webb’s City. The NAACP was fighting to defend what they believed was their constitutional right to picket businesses in St. Petersburg. On the other hand, Doc Webb continued to defend his business by citing his concern for the safety of his employees and that his business had lost a great deal of money because of the NAACP led protests; a comptroller for Webb’s City testified that Doc’s business had lost a total of $13,146. In 1961 Webb’s city removed its barriers that discriminated against race, nevertheless, the court case continued all the way to the U.S. Supreme Court until a final judgment was reached in 1964. The Supreme Court decided the case had been resolved by the lifting of racial barriers. However, it has been suggested that the Supreme Court would have sided with the NAACP.

Doc Webb’s issues with the NAACP did not end in 1964. In 1968, the NAACP supported a garbage workers strike in St. Petersburg by picketing and calling for a boycott of downtown St. Petersburg businesses. Webb’s City was included in the area of the boycott and picketing. This boycott was not as peaceful as the 1960 pickets. Six people of a large group of protesters were arrested at Webb’s City for “interfering with business” and were heard yelling threats such as, “Lets burn it down, we’ll start with Webb’s”; Doc Webb did not pursue a permanent injunction and peaceful small groups of protesters were allowed to continue picketing at Webb’s City.

Other legal cases 
Webb was taken to court for selling Ipana toothpaste below Bristol-Meyers' suggested retail price. The case went all the way to the Florida Supreme Court which ruled in Webb's favor. A few years later several distilleries also took Webb to court for similar reasons. The courts again ruled in Webb's favor.

References

External links 

 an article about Doc Webb and his city
 

Defunct department stores based in Florida
1920s establishments in Florida
1979 disestablishments in Florida
Culture of St. Petersburg, Florida